Sir Nicholas Colthurst, 4th Baronet (1789–1829) was an Anglo-Irish politician.

He served in the House of Commons of the United Kingdom as the Member of Parliament (MP) for Cork City 1812–1829.

He was the fourth of the Colthurst baronets in the Baronetage of Ireland, the only son of Sir Nicholas Colthurst, 3rd Baronet and  Harriet LaTouche. In 1810, Sir Nicholas Colthurst got a grant from the British Government for £20,000 to begin the construction of Cork City Gaol. Although pledged to oppose Catholic Emancipation, he felt it necessary at times to temporise on the issue., as the Roman Catholic influence was strong in Cork city.

He married his cousin Elizabeth Vesey and had four sons and one daughter.

References

1789 births
1829 deaths
Members of the Parliament of the United Kingdom for Cork City
Colthurst, 04th Baronet
19th-century Anglo-Irish people
UK MPs 1812–1818
UK MPs 1818–1820
UK MPs 1820–1826
UK MPs 1826–1830
Nicholas